Knocking Hoe is a 7.7 hectare National Nature Reserve and biological Site of Special Scientific Interest near Pegsdon in Bedfordshire. It is mentioned in A Nature Conservation Review. It is part of the Chilterns Area of Outstanding Natural Beauty, and is managed by Natural England. 

The site is a flat bottomed valley with steep sides. The unimproved chalk grassland has several nationally rare plants, including moon carrot, spotted catsear, field fleawort, burnt tip orchid and pasque flower. There are also a variety of wild flowers such as the autumn lady’s tresses, which has been studied on the site for over fifty years. The ancient strip lynchet field system is of archaeological interest.

There is access by a footpath from Hitchin Road in Pegsdon.

See also
List of Sites of Special Scientific Interest in Bedfordshire
National Nature Reserves in Bedfordshire

References

Sites of Special Scientific Interest in Bedfordshire
National nature reserves in England
Nature Conservation Review sites